CITE or Cite may refer to:

 Cite, a reference to a published or unpublished source
 CITE-FM, a radio station in Montreal, Quebec
 Center for Innovation Testing and Evaluation, a facility proposed in 2012 in New Mexico to test new technologies
 Centre for IT Education, Bhubaneswar, a college of information technology and business management in Odisha, India
 Cite (magazine), American quarterly magazine
 Certified Incentive Travel Executive, a type of certification for a meeting and convention planner
 Cite (cycling team)

See also
 Cité (disambiguation)
 Convention on International Trade in Endangered Species (CITES)
 Citation (disambiguation)